A  (pl. Usually operating in husband-and-wife pairs, shluchim operate Chabad Houses, Jewish day schools, and Jewish summer camps. As of 2021, there are over 6,500 Chabad  families worldwide, operating over 3,500 institutions in over 110 countries. Chabad runs the largest network of synagogues as of 2023.

History

Starting in the 1950s, the Chabad-Lubavitch Rebbe, Rabbi Menachem Mendel Schneerson, sent many thousands of  all over the world, often to remote locations, to bring Jews closer to Judaism through his mitzvah campaigns, and to assist Jewish communities worldwide in their religious needs.

The first permanent Chabad House on a college campus was established at UCLA in 1969.

The  (lit. Assembly of Emissaries) is the annual gathering of Chabad  held in the fall of each year. The conference is typically held in New York City on the weekend prior to the Hebrew month of Kislev. Over 5,600  gather each year, making the assembly the largest rabbinical conference in the world. The 2011  was a four-day event including general sessions, nearly 100 workshops, an expo, and resource fair, and a banquet attended by close to 3,000 women.

Both  are simulcast in multiple languages and have extensive tracking, including programs for lay leaders and children.

Notable 
Gavriel Holtzberg (1979–2008)
Berel Lazar (born 1964)
Mendy Chitrik (born 1977)
Pinchus Feldman (born 1944)
Manis Friedman (born 1946)
Mordechai Gutnick
Chezki Lifshitz (born 1974)
Zalman I. Posner (1927–2014) 
Menachem Shmuel David Raichik (1918–1998) 
Abraham Shemtov (born 1937)
Gershon Mendel Garelik

References

External links
Chabad's Shluchim websites network
Chabad's Kinus (Conference) Website

Chabad outreach
Chabad-Lubavitch (Hasidic dynasty)